Bryan Anthony Richardson (born 24 February 1944) is a former English cricketer. Richardson was a left-handed batsman who bowled leg break. He was born at Kenilworth, Warwickshire.

Richardson made his first-class debut for Warwickshire against Scotland in 1963 at The Grange, Edinburgh. He played first-class cricket for Warwickshire for five seasons, making a total of forty appearances, the last of which came in the 1967 County Championship against Yorkshire at Acklam Park, Middlesbrough. In his forty matches, he scored a total of 1,323 runs at an average of 19.45, with a high score of 126. This score was one of two centuries he made and came against Cambridge University in 1967. This season was also his most success, with him making fifteen appearances, three times as many as he had in any other season. He scored 727 runs at an average of 30.29, recording both his first-class centuries, as well as three half centuries. He also made a single List A appearance for the county in the quarter-final of the 1964 Gillette Cup against Northamptonshire. In what was a Warwickshire victory, Richardson scored 17 runs before being dismissed by Brian Crump.

His brothers, Peter and Dick, both played Test cricket for England.

He was chairman of Coventry City F.C. from 1993 until 2002.

References

External links
Bryan Richardson at ESPNcricinfo
Bryan Richardson at CricketArchive

1944 births
Living people
People from Kenilworth
English cricketers
Warwickshire cricketers
Coventry City F.C. directors and chairmen